Innocent Eyes is the fourth solo studio album by British singer-songwriter Graham Nash, released in 1986. The influence of reggae shows in the hit song "Chippin' Away".

The album reached No. 136 on the Billboard charts.

Track listing
All songs written by Graham Nash, except where noted.

Charts

Personnel 

 Graham Nash – vocals, rhythm guitar (2), keyboards (5, 7, 10), guitars (9)
 Craig Doerge – keyboards
 Bill Boydston – keyboards (1, 4, 6), LinnDrum programming (1, 2, 4–8, 10)
 Paul Bliss – keyboards (3), bass (3), drum programming (3)
 Alan Pasqua – keyboards (10)
 Michael Landau – guitars (1, 3, 5–10)
 David Lindley – lead guitar (2)
 Jeff Southworth – guitars (4, 6)
 Waddy Wachtel – guitars (5)
 George "Chocolate" Perry – bass (2, 4, 7, 8)
 Tim Drummond – bass (2, 7)
 Leland Sklar – bass (9)
 Mark Williams – drum overdubs (1, 2, 5, 6, 10), drums (3)
 Ian Wallace – drum overdubs (4, 8)
 David Plantshon – drums (9)
 Michael Fisher – percussion (1, 4, 6, 7, 9, 10)
 Joe Lala – percussion (7)
 Kenny Loggins – additional vocals (3)
 Kate Yester – additional vocals (6)
 James Taylor – additional vocals (7)
 Stanley Johnston – engineer
 Jay Parti – engineer
 Greg Ladanyi – mixing at The Complex (Los Angeles, California)
 Doug Sax and Mike Reese – LP mastering at The Mastering Lab (Hollywood, California)
 Barry Diament – CD mastering at Atlantic Studios (New York City, New York)
 Reed Fenton – photography
 Dawn Patrol and Jimmy Wachtel – art direction, design

References

1986 albums
Graham Nash albums
Albums produced by Graham Nash
Albums with cover art by Jimmy Wachtel
Atlantic Records albums